Oliver Twist is a novel by Charles Dickens.

Oliver Twist may also refer to:

Oliver Twist (character), the protagonist of Dickens' novel

Films
Oliver Twist (1909 film), first adaptation of Dickens' novel, a silent film starring Edith Storey and Elita Proctor Otis
Oliver Twist (1912 British film), a silent film adaptation, directed by Thomas Bentley
Oliver Twist (1912 American film), a silent film adaptation starring Nat C. Goodwin
Oliver Twist (1916 film), a 1916 silent film adaptation, starring Marie Doro and Tully Marshall
Oliver Twist (1919 film), a silent Hungarian film adaptation
Oliver Twist, Jr., a 1921 American silent drama film
Oliver Twist (1922 film), silent film adaptation featuring Lon Chaney and Jackie Coogan
Oliver Twist (1933 film), a 1933 film adaptation of Dickens' novel, and the first one with sound, starring Dickie Moore.
Oliver Twist (1948 film), a 1948 film adaptation by David Lean, starring John Howard Davies.
Oliver! (1968 film), a 1968 film adaptation directed by Carol Reed, based on the stage musical, adapted from the novel
Oliver Twist (1974 film), a 1974 animation film co-written by Ben Starr
Oliver Twist (1982 Australian film), a 1982 Australian animated film 
Oliver Twist (1982 TV film), a 1982 television movie adaptation starring Richard Charles and George C. Scott
Oliver Twist (1997 film), a 1997 television movie adaptation
Oliver Twist (2005 film), a 2005 film adaptation by Roman Polanski

Television series
Oliver Twist (1962 TV serial), a 1962 BBC television serial starring Bruce Prochnik and Max Adrian 
Oliver Twist (1985 TV serial), a British television serial starring Ben Rodska and Eric Porter
Oliver Twist (1999 TV series), a 1999 TV serial adaptation starring Sam Smith and Robert Lindsay
Oliver Twist (2007 TV series), a 2007 BBC television serial adaptation starring William Miller and Timothy Spall

Songs
"Oliver Twist" (Vaughn De Leath song), 1921 written to accompany the 1922 silent film
"Oliver Twist", song by Rod McKuen, written by Gladys Shelley and Rod McKuen 1962
"Oliver Twist", song by Avey Tare from Down There
"Oliver Twist" (D'banj song), 2012
"Oliver Twist", a 2021 song by ArrDee from Pier Pressure

Other uses
Oliver Twist (Guthrie), a sculpture by Trace Guthrie in Hermann Park, Houston, Texas, US
Oliver Twist Tobacco, a Scandinavian chewing tobacco brand by Hermann Krügers Eftf. A/S, Denmark

See also
Oliver's Twist, a television cooking show featuring Jamie Oliver
"Oliver's Twist", a 1961 song by Bob Miller and the Millermen
Variations of the name for other adaptations of Dickens' novel